Van Richten's Guide to Fiends is an accessory for the 2nd edition of the Advanced Dungeons & Dragons fantasy role-playing game.

Contents
Van Richten's Guide to Fiends, a supplement for the Ravenloft campaign setting discusses the nature, powers and motivations of fiends.

Publication history
Van Richten's Guide to Fiends was written by Teeuwynn Woodruff, and published by TSR, Inc.

Reception

Reviews
Rollespilsmagasinet Fønix (Danish) (Issue 10 - October/November 1995)

References

Ravenloft supplements
Role-playing game supplements introduced in 1995